There are 39 multi-member electoral districts, known as Dáil constituencies, that elect 160 TDs (members of parliament), to Dáil Éireann, the house of representatives of the Oireachtas, Ireland's parliament, on the system of proportional representation by means of the single transferable vote (PR-STV), to a maximum term of five years.

Electoral law
Article 16.2 of the Constitution of Ireland outlines the requirements for constituencies. The total number of TDs is to be no more than one TD representing twenty thousand and no less than one TD representing thirty thousand of the population, and the ratio should be the same in each constituency, as far as practicable, avoiding malapportionment. Under the Constitution, constituencies are to be revised at least once in every twelve years in accordance with the census reports, which are compiled by the Central Statistics Office every five years.

Under the Electoral Reform Act 2022, the Electoral Commission is to conduct a review of all constituencies on the publication, by the Central Statistics Office, of the preliminary result of the census. The Commission is independent and is responsible for the redrawing of constituency boundaries. Any alterations to constituencies do not take effect during the life of the Dáil sitting when a revision is made. Prior to the establishment of the Commission in 2023, constituency reviews were carried out by a Constituency Commission under the Electoral Act 1997, as amended.

The constitution specifies that the minimum number of TDs returned for each constituency is three, but does not define the maximum number; however, electoral law specifies a maximum number of five TDs. The electoral system for general elections is proportional representation by means of a single transferable vote (PR-STV). PR-STV is also used at European Parliament elections and local elections. Although they are conducted under the same rules, in the case of by-elections (where this is only one vacancy) and presidential elections, this becomes alternative vote.

Proposed constituencies
On its establishment in February 2023, the Electoral Commission sought submissions for a review of Dáil constituencies and European Parliament constituencies following the publication of the 2022 census preliminary results. It will recommend a Dáil size of between 171 and 181 members, and increase from the current membership of 160 TDs.

Current constituencies
The 2017 report of the Constituency Commission, proposed several changes to Dáil constituencies. These changes were provided for by the Electoral (Amendment) (Dáil Constituencies) Act 2017, which came into effect at the 2020 general election. The total number of TDs increased by two to 160, while the number of constituencies was reduced by one to 39, as well as various boundary revisions.

See also
Historic Dáil constituencies

References

External links
Oireachtas.ie – Constituency Dashboards
Department of Housing, Local Government and Heritage   – Dáil Constituency Maps
ElectionsIreland.org – Boundary Revisions

 
Lists of parliamentary constituencies in Ireland
Republic of Ireland geography-related lists
Republic of Ireland politics-related lists